M'daourouch is a commune in Souk Ahras Province, Algeria, occupying the site of the Berber-Roman town of Madauros in Numidia.

Demographics
As of the 2008 census, Mdawrush has 36,351 inhabitants, which gives it 11 seats in the PMA.

History
It was an old Numidian town which, having once belonged to the Masaesylian kingdom of Syphax, was annexed to that of Masinissa at the close of the second Punic War. It became a Roman colony about the end of the first century and was famous for its schools.
 
It was the native town of Apuleius, author of The Golden Ass, and of the grammarians Nonius Marcellus and Maximus. Augustine of Hippo studied there; through a letter which he addressed later to the inhabitants we learn that many were still pagans.
 
Madauros had many martyrs known by their epitaphs; several are named in the Roman Martyrology on 4 July.
 
Its bishopric is included in the Catholic Church's list of titular sees. Three bishops are known: Antigonus, who attended the Council of Carthage of 349; Placentius, the Council of Carthage of 407 and the Conference of 411; and Pudentius, sent into exile by the Vandal king Huneric with the other bishops who had been present at the Synod of 484.
 
The ruins of Madauros are seen near Mdawrush. A fine Roman mausoleum, vast thermae, a Byzantine fortress, and a Roman basilica are noteworthy and have furnished several Christian inscriptions.

References

External links
 
 Catholic Encyclopedia article

Populated places in Souk Ahras Province
Madaurus
Cities in Algeria
Algeria